Upinder Singh is an Indian historian who is Professor of History and Dean of Faculty at Ashoka University. She is the former head of the History Department at the University of Delhi. She is also the recipient of the inaugural Infosys Prize in the category of Social Sciences (History).

Education and professional life
Singh is an alumna of St. Stephen's College, Delhi and received a PhD from McGill University in Canada. She has a Master of Arts in history and an M.Phil. in history, both from the University of Delhi. She has a Ph.D. from McGill University, Montreal, Canada, with a thesis titled Kings, Brahmanas, and Temples in Orissa: an epigraphic study (300-1147 CE). She is a Professor in the Department of History at Ashoka University.

Personal life
Singh is the daughter of Manmohan Singh, the former prime minister of India, and Gursharan Kaur. She is married to Vijay Tankha, a professor of philosophy and has two sons.

Honours
Singh was awarded the Netherlands Government Reciprocal Fellowship in 1985, to pursue research at the Instituut Kern, Leiden. She was awarded the Ancient India and Iran Trust/Wallace India Visiting Fellowship to pursue research in Cambridge and London in 1999. She was also a visiting fellow of Lucy Cavendish College, Cambridge. Singh has received the prestigious Daniel Ingalls Fellowship at the Harvard-Yenching Institute, Harvard University in 2005.

She is the national coordinator for history at the Institute of Life Long Learning at the University of Delhi.

She was visiting professor at the University of Leuven, Belgium, as the recipient of the Erasmus Mundus Fellowship, May–June 2010.

Controversies
On 25 February 2008, right wing activists demonstrated in the University of Delhi campus, in protest of an essay by A.K. Ramanujan, titled Three Hundred Ramayanas. The activists felt the essay was offensive, and alleged that Singh was responsible for its inclusion in a list of recommended readings for the BA programme in history. The University denied the allegation and stated that Singh was "… neither the editor nor compiler of the book on Cultural History of Ancient India."

Publications

Books authored
 
 
  (for children)

Books edited

Papers

See also
History of India

References

Historians of South Asia
Indian Sikhs
Punjabi people
Living people
Children of prime ministers of India
Manmohan Singh
1959 births
21st-century Indian historians